NSS-7 is a communications satellite owned by SES World Skies.  It launched on 16 April 2002 on an AR-44L model of the Ariane 4 launch vehicle.

It is a hybrid Ku- and C-band telecommunications satellite providing fixed satellite services, including video distribution, Internet access, corporate business networking and fixed services such as telephony and data. Based on an enhanced version of Lockheed Martin's A2100AX satellite bus, this 72 transponder satellite initially operated at 22° West longitude over the Atlantic Ocean, providing coverage to the whole of Africa.  In May 2012 it shifted over to the 20° West location to take over the duties of NSS-5.

References

External links

 Official SES Site
International Media Switzerland Official provider's site

Communications satellites in geostationary orbit
Spacecraft launched in 2002
SES satellites
NSS-07